Vladimir Rubashvili (1940 – 1964) was a wrestler from Georgia. He was Olympic bronze medalist in Freestyle wrestling in 1960, competing for the Soviet Union.

References

1940 births
1964 deaths
Soviet male sport wrestlers
Olympic wrestlers of the Soviet Union
Wrestlers at the 1960 Summer Olympics
Male sport wrestlers from Georgia (country)
Olympic bronze medalists for the Soviet Union
Olympic medalists in wrestling
Medalists at the 1960 Summer Olympics
World Wrestling Champions